ISO 3166-2:CN is the entry for China in ISO 3166-2, part of the ISO 3166 standard published by the International Organization for Standardization (ISO), which defines codes for the names of the principal subdivisions (e.g. provinces or states) of all countries coded in ISO 3166-1.

Currently for China, ISO 3166-2 codes are defined for the following province-level subdivisions:

 23 provinces
 4 direct-administered municipalities
 5 autonomous regions
 2 special administrative regions

The full name of China in ISO 3166 is the People's Republic of China (PRC). Yet China is de facto divided into the PRC and the Republic of China (Taiwan) with limited recognition. Taiwan, which consists of the namesake island and the Penghu Islands, is included as a province of China because of its political status within the United Nations, as even though it is de facto under the jurisdiction of the Republic of China instead of the People's Republic of China ("China"), the United Nations considers Taiwan as part of "China". In addition, Kinmen and the Matsu Islands in the fractured Fuchien (Fujian) Province are also governed by the ROC. 

Each code consists of two parts, separated by a hyphen. The second part is a two-letter alphabetic code specified by Guobiao GB/T 2260 (first published 1991, prior to ISO 3166-2, first published 1998).

Current codes 
Subdivision names are listed as in the ISO 3166-2 standard published by the ISO 3166 Maintenance Agency (ISO 3166/MA).

Click on the button in the header to sort each column.

 Notes

Subdivisions included in ISO 3166-1 
Besides being included as subdivisions of China in ISO 3166-2, Taiwan, Hong Kong and Macao are also officially assigned their own country codes in ISO 3166-1.

In ISO 3166-1, Taiwan is listed under the country name "Taiwan, Province of China".

Changes 
The following changes to the entry have been announced in newsletters by the ISO 3166/MA since the first publication of ISO 3166-2 in 1998:

The following changes to the entry are listed on ISO's online catalogue, the Online Browsing Platform:

See also 
 Administrative divisions of China
 FIPS region codes of China

External links
 ISO Online Browsing Platform: CN
 Provinces of China, Statoids.com

2:CN
ISO 3166-2
China geography-related lists